John William Glover (29 October 1896 – 19 March 1962) was an English footballer who played for Southport and Wigan Borough.

Born in Blowick, Southport, Glover began his professional career with his hometown club Southport, scoring 33 goals in 54 Football League appearances. before being signed by Wigan Borough in January 1923 for a fee of £1,250. He was Wigan's top scorer in the 1924–25 season, with a total of 15 goals, but broke his leg in the penultimate game of the season against Grimsby Town. He played twice during the following season, but never fully recovered from the injury, effectively ending his career at the professional level.

References

1896 births
1962 deaths
Footballers from Southport
English footballers
Association football forwards
Southport F.C. players
English Football League players
Wigan Borough F.C. players